"There's Nothing Holdin' Me Back" is a song recorded by Canadian singer Shawn Mendes. Written by Mendes, Teddy Geiger, Geoff Warburton and Scott Harris, and produced by Geiger and Andrew Maury, it was released as a single on April 20, 2017. The song was included in the reissue of his second studio album Illuminate (2016). An accompanying music video was released on June 20, 2017. The single reached the top 10 in several countries, including the US and the UK.

Composition
"There's Nothing Holdin' Me Back" is a "dance-y" pop rock track. A Billboard editor noted it features some electric guitar and "strained" vocals on the chorus. As the upbeat track progresses, it incorporates handclaps, funky guitar riffs, and foot-tapping bass. The pre-chorus was inspired by early works of Timbaland and Justin Timberlake.

Critical reception
Writing for Billboard, Taylor Weatherby noted "the song's sound falls right in line with the guitar-laced goodness he brought on his sophomore effort, but this time bringing in a little more edge." Allison Bowsher for Much opined the sound "is a return to the earworms that launched Mendes' career back in 2015. Reminiscent of the high energy pop sensibilities of Mendes' "Something Big," today's new track plays with lifts and falls throughout, allowing Mendes to show off the strength of his voice." In MTV News, Madeline Roth thought the track is "more danceable than anything in his catalog. His voice is gritty and hoarse, especially on the passionate, aggressive hook."

TIME chose the song as a contender for one of the songs of the summer, commending the "smart use of both electric guitar and tropical house beat." Billboard considered it the 44th best song of the year, CBC Music named it the 5th.

Live performances
"There's Nothing Holdin' Me Back" is featured on the Illuminate World Tour setlist. The singer performed the single on The Graham Norton Show on June 9, 2017, at Capital FM's Summertime Ball 2017 on June 10, The Tonight Show Starring Jimmy Fallon on June 19, at the 2017 MTV Video Music Awards on August 27, and at the 2017 MTV Europe Music Awards on 12 November 2017, in which Billboard named his performance the second best of the night. On May 18, 2018, Mendes was a special guest on Taylor Swift's Reputation Stadium Tour, and performed the song alongside Swift at the Rose Bowl in Pasadena, California.

Chart performance
In the United States, the song has peaked at number 6, becoming Mendes' third top 10 single on the US Billboard Hot 100. In Canada, the song has reached a peak of 6, becoming his highest-charting single in his home country at the time. He has since surpassed this peak with his single "If I Can't Have You" which reached number 2 in May 2019. It has reached the top 5 in several other countries such as Australia, Denmark, Germany, Ireland, Scotland, and the United Kingdom

Music video
The music video for the song was released on June 20, 2017, directed by Jay Martin, and produced by Cal Gordon. Filmed throughout various places in Europe, the video shows Mendes and his dating partner (played by an actress Ellie Bamber) exploring Paris, Amsterdam and the United Kingdom and racing through transportation hubs, ride trains, and trek along the coastline while additional footage is also shown with Mendes out on tour from his concerts. In July 2021, the music video reached the 1 billion view milestone, Harris' fourth video to do so.

Usage in media

The song is heard in the television series The Good Doctor at the closing of Season 1, Episode 4 in a scene set in a bar. It was also the song used by Dancing with the Stars season 25 winners Jordan Fisher and Lindsay Arnold in their first dance, a tango, and by season 24 finalist Normani in her final fusion dance with Val Chmerkovskiy. It can also be heard in national TV ads for Ford Motor Company of Australia. The Portuguese supermarket chain Continente used a Portuguese language cover of the song in its 2018 TV Christmas campaign.
It also appears in the movie Little Italy with Emma Roberts and Hayden Christensen. It is also featured in the 2021 film Sing 2, as well as its trailer, and it was covered by Taron Egerton and Tori Kelly on the film's soundtrack.

Track listing
Digital download (NOTD Remix)
"There's Nothing Holdin' Me Back" (NOTD remix) – 3:14

Digital download (Acoustic)
"There's Nothing Holdin' Me Back" (Acoustic) – 3:21

Accolades

Charts

Weekly charts

Year-end charts

Certifications

Release history

See also
List of Billboard Adult Contemporary number ones of 2017 and 2018 (U.S.)

References

2017 songs
2017 singles
Shawn Mendes songs
Songs written by Teddy Geiger
Songs written by Scott Harris (songwriter)
Songs written by Shawn Mendes
Torch songs
Songs written by Geoff Warburton
Island Records singles
Universal Music Group singles
Folktronica songs